Cuza Vodă is a commune in Constanța County, Northern Dobruja, Romania.

The commune includes one village: Cuza Vodă (historical name: Docuzol) - named after the Romanian Domnitor Alexandru Ioan Cuza.

Demographics
At the 2011 census, Cuza Vodă had 2,557 Romanians (76.10%), 800 Roma (23.81%), 3 others (0.09%).

References

Communes in Constanța County
Localities in Northern Dobruja